The 2006 V8 Supercars Winton round was a motor race for V8 Supercars held on the weekend of 2–4 June 2006. The event was held at the Winton Motor Raceway in Benalla, Victoria, and consisted of three races culminating in 378 kilometres. It was the fourth round of thirteen in the 2006 V8 Supercar Championship Series.

The event was notable for Jason Richards' only race win, coming in the reverse-grid heat.

Background
José Fernández and Fabian Coulthard replaced Tony Ricciardello and Alan Gurr at Britek Motorsport and Paul Morris Motorsport respectively.

Results

Qualifying

Top Ten Shootout

Race 1

Race 2

Race 3

Round standings

Championship standings

References

Winton
Winton V8 Supercars
Motorsport in Victoria (Australia)